Machipanda is a town in Manica District, in the middle of  Manica Province, Mozambique, near the border with Zimbabwe.

Transport 
The city has one of the most important railway stations on the Beira–Bulawayo railway (or Machipanda railway), that connects it to the cities of Beira and Harare, the capital of Zimbabwe.

See also 
 Railway stations in Mozambique

References 

Populated places in Manica Province